A runaway truck ramp, runaway truck lane, escape lane, emergency escape ramp, or truck arrester bed is a traffic device that enables vehicles which are having braking problems to safely stop. It is typically a long, sand- or gravel-filled lane connected to a steep downhill grade section of a main road, and is designed to accommodate large trucks or buses. It allows a moving vehicle's kinetic energy to be dissipated gradually in a controlled and relatively harmless way, helping the operator stop it safely.

Design
Emergency escape ramps are usually located in mountainous areas which cause high construction costs and present difficult site selection. A ramp may cost US$1 million. Designs include:

Arrester bed: a gravel-filled ramp adjacent to the road that uses rolling resistance to stop the vehicle.  The required length of the bed depends on the mass and speed of the vehicle, the grade of the arrester bed, and the rolling resistance provided by the gravel.  These are similar to gravel or sand traps used on motor racing circuits in runoff areas on road courses and drag strips,
Gravity escape ramp: a long, upwardly inclined path parallel to the road. Substantial length is required. Control can be difficult for the driver; problems include rollback after the vehicle stops.
Sand pile escape ramp: a short length of loosely piled sand. Problems include sudden, forceful deceleration; sand being affected by weather conditions (moisture and freezing); and vehicles vaulting and/or overturning after contacting the sand pile.
Mechanical-arrestor escape ramp: a proprietary system of stainless-steel nets transversely spanning a paved ramp to engage and retard a runaway vehicle.  Ramps of this type are typically shorter than gravity ramps, and can work even on a downhill grade. These systems tend to be costly, but may save expensive real estate in crowded areas and prevent even more costly crashes.  One such ramp at Avon, Connecticut in the United States has an electrically heated pavement surface to prevent snow and ice accumulation. 
Alternatives: such as a vehicle arresting barrier.

Location
Emergency escape ramps are usually located on steep, sustained grades, as in mountainous areas. Long descending grades can allow high vehicle speeds to be reached, and truck brakes can overheat and fail through extensive use. The ramps are often built before a critical change in the radius of curvature of the road, or before a place that may require the vehicle to stop, such as before an intersection in a populated area. 
The placement criteria can vary from one region/country to another.

Gallery

See also

 Catch points
 Derail
 Engineered materials arrestor system
 Runway safety area (RSA/RESA) for airplanes

References

External links

Design considerations

Query executed on live Openstreetmap data. Move the map to your area of interest and press Run
Video: runaway truck on gravel ramp

Road safety
Trucks
Road infrastructure